On 19 December 2020, a fire at occurred at privately run Sanko University Hospital in Gaziantep, Turkey. It killed nine people who were aged between 56 and 85. The fire broke out in the intensive care unit which was treating COVID-19 patients. It started at 4:45am, caused by an oxygen cylinder exploding on the ward, while 19 patients were present.

See also
 Piatra Neamț hospital fire

References

2020 disasters in Turkey
2020 fires in Asia
Hospital fire
COVID-19 pandemic in Turkey
December 2020 events in Turkey
Explosions in 2020
Explosions in Turkey
Fires in Turkey
Hospital fires in Asia